is a song recorded by American recording artist Yuna Ito. The song will serve as her fifteenth Japanese-language single released by Studioseven Recordings. "Mamotte Agetai" has been described as a "ballad track which promises to be the hit of winter 2010". The leading track is the theme song for the Japanese drama  which premiered on October 20, 2010.

Track listing 

 Source: Joshin

Charts 

"Mamotte Agetai" - Oricon Sales Chart (Japan)

References 

2010 singles
Japanese-language songs
Yuna Ito songs
2010 songs